The Armstrong Siddeley Python was an early British turboprop engine designed and built by the Armstrong Siddeley company in the mid-1940s. Its main use was in the Westland Wyvern, a carrier-based heavy fighter. The prototypes had used the Rolls-Royce Eagle piston engine, but Pythons were used in production aircraft. In this application, the Python was rated at 4,110 equivalent shaft horsepower (eshp).

Design and development
The design started as an experimental pure-turbojet known as the ASX, which commenced testing in 1943. By this point other engine designs were already entering pre-production, and it seemed there was little need for the ASX in its existing form. The design was then modified by the addition of a reduction gearbox to drive a propeller. The turboprop thus formed was named ASP.

Flight testing
Early flight-testing of the Python was carried out using the Lancaster B.1 (FE) TW911 and the Lincoln B.2 RE339/G: in each aircraft Pythons replaced the two outboard Rolls-Royce Merlins.

Lincoln B.2 RF403 had two Pythons similarly installed and was used for high-altitude bombing trials at Woomera, South Australia. These trials were principally of the ballistic casings for the Blue Danube atomic weapon: the Lincoln was the only available aircraft that could accommodate the large weapon casing, measuring 62 inches diameter x  in length. The Pythons were fitted to increase the height from which tests could be carried out.

Python Engine on public display
An Armstrong Siddeley Python is on display at the East Midlands Aeropark Castle Donington.

Variants
ASP.1 (Python 1)reduction gear ratio 0.127:1
ASP.2 (Python 2)reduction gear ratio 0.135:1
ASP.3 (Python 3)

Applications
Avro Lancaster - (test only)
Avro Lincoln - (test only)
Westland Wyvern

Specifications (ASP.3)

See also

References

Notes

Bibliography

External links

Image of the Python-engined Lancaster B.Mk.I (FE) TW911
"Python" a 1949 Flight article on the Python

1940s turboprop engines
Python
Axial-compressor gas turbine engines